Todd Doherty   (born 1968) is a Canadian politician who was elected as a Member of Parliament in the House of Commons of Canada to represent the federal electoral district Cariboo—Prince George during the 2015 Canadian federal election.

Todd Doherty is married to Kelly and together they have four children.

Todd and Kelly have been small business owners for over 20 years. Todd previously was an aviation executive and worked with industry, provincial and federal governments in global promotion of national trade, tourism and aviation opportunities.

During the first sitting of the 42nd Parliament Todd Doherty tabled four private members bills:

 Bill C-211 An Act to Establish a National Framework on PTSD and Mental Health Challenges with First Responders, Veterans and Military. Bill C-211 was passed unanimously June 16, 2017 and currently is in Senate for review.
 Bill C-209 This enactment amends the Corrections and Conditional Release Act to require the Correctional Service of Canada, in certain circumstances to disclose details of statutory release of a high-profile offender. Making public disclosure of the details of the release and informing any victims of such release.
 Bill C-207 This enactment designates the third day of March in each and every year as a day for the people of Canada to express appreciation for the heroic work of members of the Canadian Forces and emergency response professionals, including police officers, firefighters and paramedics
 Bill C-208 This enactment amends the Canada Evidence Act to direct courts on how to interpret a written all-numeric date in Canada that is in dispute.

In addition, Bill C-347 was authored by Todd Doherty and calls on the Federal Government to establish a national service medal for Search & Rescue volunteers. The largest national volunteer group that was without a national medal in recognition of service. 
Although authored by Mr Doherty, he gave permission for MP Mel Arnold to table C-347 due to C-211's progress through Parliament.

In October 2017, the Government of Canada announced the creation of a national service medal for Search & Rescue volunteers.

In November, 2020 Doherty tabled a motion to create a single national three-digit telephone number, 988, for suicide hotlines, arguing that having to look up existing 10-digit numbers presents a barrier to use. In December the House of Commons voted unanimously in favour of his proposal.

Electoral record

References

External links
https://www.todddoherty.ca/ personal web site
https://www.ourcommons.ca/members/en/todd-doherty(89249) House of Commons web site

Living people
Canadian aviators
Conservative Party of Canada MPs
Members of the House of Commons of Canada from British Columbia
People from Prince George, British Columbia
21st-century Canadian politicians
1968 births